Josimar is a given name. It may refer to:

 Josimar Melo (born 1954), Brazilian food and wine journalist
 Josimar (footballer, born 1961), Josimar Higino Pereira, Brazilian football right-back
 Josimar (footballer, born 1972), Josimar de Carvalho Ferreira, Brazilian football forward
 Josimar Mosquera (born 1982), Colombian football centre-back
 Josimar (footballer, born 1984), Josimar da Silva Martins, Brazilian football striker
 Josimar (footballer, born 1986), Josimar Rosado da Silva Tavares, Brazilian football defensive midfielder
 Vozinha (born 1989), Josimar Dias, Cape Verdean football goalkeeper
 Josimar (footballer, born 1987), Josimar Rodrigues Souza Roberto, Brazilian football striker
 Josimar Quiñonez (born 1987), Colombian football defender
 Josimar Ayarza (born 1987), Panamanian basketball player
 Josimar (footballer, born 1988), Josimar Moreira Matos de Souza, Brazilian football forward
 Josimar Atoche (born 1989), Peruvian football midfielder
 Josimar Lima (born 1989), Cape Verdean football centre-back
 Josimar Vargas (born 1990), Peruvian football midfielder
 Josimar Heredia (born 1993), Mexican football centre-back
 Josimar Quintero (born 1997), Ecuadorian football midfielder